Alexandru Tudose (born 3 April 1987) is a Romanian footballer who last plays as a centre back for Malaysia Premier League club UKM.

Steaua București
 First match in Liga I for Steaua: 10 April 2009 • Steaua-Gloria 1–1.

International career
 Tudose was captain of the Romania Under 17 squad.

Honours
Melaka United
 Malaysia Premier League:2016

External links
 
 

1987 births
Living people
Sportspeople from Galați
Romanian footballers
Association football defenders
ASC Oțelul Galați players
FC UTA Arad players
FC Steaua București players
FC Steaua II București players
FC Gloria Buzău players
ACF Gloria Bistrița players
FC Dinamo București players
CSM Corona Brașov footballers
FC Rapid București players
AFC Săgeata Năvodari players
FC Hoverla Uzhhorod players
FC Petrolul Ploiești players
Liga I players
Romanian expatriate footballers
Expatriate footballers in Ukraine
Romania under-21 international footballers
Romanian expatriate sportspeople in Malaysia
Expatriate footballers in Malaysia
Melaka United F.C. players
ASA 2013 Târgu Mureș players
Romanian expatriate sportspeople in Ukraine